Samuel B. Stanchfield (March 17, 1837 – March 10, 1919) was an American politician and farmer who served as a member of the Wisconsin State Assembly and the Wisconsin Senate.

Early life
Stanchfield was born on March 17, 1837, in Leeds, Maine. He moved to Fond du Lac, Wisconsin, in 1855.

Career
Stanchfield served as a member of the Senate from 1888 to 1892. Previously, he had been a member of the Assembly from 1886 and 1886. Additionally, Stanchfield was chairman of the Fond du Lac Town Board, clerk of Fond du Lac, and chairman of the Fond du Lac County, Wisconsin Board. He was a Republican.

Personal life 
Stanchfield died in Fond du Lac on March 10, 1919.

References

People from Leeds, Maine
Politicians from Fond du Lac, Wisconsin
County supervisors in Wisconsin
Republican Party Wisconsin state senators
Republican Party members of the Wisconsin State Assembly
1837 births
1919 deaths